An isotropic helicoid is a shape that is helical, so it rotates as it moves through a fluid, and yet is isotropic, so that its rotation and drag are the same for all orientations of the particle.  It was first proposed by Lord Kelvin in 1871, who described a specific geometry with twelve vanes placed around a sphere. As of 2021, such a phenomenon has yet to be proven by researchers.

References

Geometric shapes